Paraxanthodes is a genus of crabs in the family Xanthidae, containing the following species:

 Paraxanthodes cumatodes (McGilchrist, 1905)
 Paraxanthodes obtusidens (Sakai, 1965)
 Paraxanthodes polynesiensis Davie, 1992

References

Xanthoidea